In 1818, Uriel Holmes (F) of  resigned from the House.  A special election was held to fill the resulting vacancy.

Election results

Gilbert took his seat November 16, 1818 at the start of the Second Session.

See also
List of special elections to the United States House of Representatives

References

Connecticut 1818 At-large
1818 At-large
Connecticut 1818 At-large
1818 Connecticut elections
United States House of Representatives 1818 At-large
Connecticut